Begonia baccata is a plant species of the genus Begonia in the family Begoniaceae, first described by Joseph Dalton Hooker in 1866. It is endemic to São Tomé Island, and grows up to 4 metres tall. It closest relative is Begonia crateris, also endemic to São Tomé.

References

External links
 

Endemic flora of São Tomé and Príncipe
Flora of São Tomé Island
baccata
Plants described in 1866